Zhang Chan (born 7 November 1997) is a Chinese cricketer who plays for China women's national cricket team in domestic and international cricket in Women's Twenty20. She made her international cricket debut in 2018 when Chinese women's team toured South Korea.

A right-handed batter with wicket-keeper role, she was also a part of China Women vs Kuwait Women in Women's Twenty20 International format held in 2019 at Yeonhui Cricket Ground. She played her last match on 22 September 2019 against HongKong in Incheon, South Korea. She was a part of China Women's team in the 2019 ICC Women's Qualifier Asia.

References 

1997 births
Living people
Chinese women cricketers
China women Twenty20 International cricketers